Arnoldo Pekelharing (1 July 1936 – 13 January 2001) was an Argentine sailor who competed in the 1956 Summer Olympics and in the 1964 Summer Olympics.

References

1936 births
2001 deaths
Argentine male sailors (sport)
Olympic sailors of Argentina
Sailors at the 1956 Summer Olympics – Dragon
Sailors at the 1964 Summer Olympics – Star